Wisdom is a form of knowledge.

Wisdom may also refer to:

Media 
 Wisdom (film), a 1986 American crime film
 Wisdom (TV series), a 1950s NBC television show featuring interviews with notable scientists, artists and politicians of the time
 WISDOM Media Group, a defunct television network operating from 1999 to 2005

Music 
 Wisdom (album), the first album of the industrial metal band 16 Volt
 "Wisdom" (song), a 1993 song by David Gray
 Wisdom (band), a Hungarian band that uses quotations as the basis for its songs

Religion and philosophy 
 Sophia (wisdom), a goddess in Greek philosophy
 Book of Wisdom, one of the deuterocanonical books of the Bible
 The Books of Wisdom of the Hebrew Bible
 The wisdom literature of the Ancient Near East
 Wisdom (personification), motif in religious and philosophical texts
 Wisdom King, type of Buddhist deity
 Prajñā

People 
 Wisdom Fofo Agbo (born 1979), Ghanaian-born Hong Kong footballer
 Wisdom Mumba Chansa (1964-1993), Zambian footballer
 Wisdom Onyekwere, former Nigerian footballer
 Wisdom Siziba (1980-2009), Zimbabwean cricketer

Other 
 Wisdom (surname)
 Wisdom (albatross), the world's oldest wild bird
 Wisdom (horse) (1873-1893)
 3402 Wisdom, an asteroid
 Wisdom, Kentucky
 Wisdom, Missouri
 Wisdom, Montana
 WISDOM Project Water-related Information System for the sustainable Development of the Mekong Delta in Vietnam
 House of Wisdom, a 9th-century research centre in Baghdad
 Wisdom tooth in humans
 Wisdom (play), a 15th-century English morality play
 Wisdom, a collective noun for a group of wombats
 WISDOM (radar) (Water Ice and Subsurface Deposit Observation on Mars), a ground-penetrating radar on the ExoMars rover
 Wisdom Airways, an airline in Thailand

See also
Sagesse (disambiguation)
Hikma (disambiguation)

English-language unisex given names